The Very Big Carla Bley Band is an album by American composer, bandleader and keyboardist Carla Bley released on the Watt/ECM label in 1991.

Reception
The Allmusic review by Brian Olewnick awarded the album  stars and stated "The result is a fairly solid, if slightly bland, date that may cause the listener to pine for her earlier "excesses"... in the end, Bley's themes and structures tend more toward the competent than the stirring or memorable, leaving one desirous of the richer fare that she has served in the past". The Penguin Guide to Jazz awarded it 3 stars, stating "A stirring live outfit the Very Big Band translates well to record, with plenty of emphasis on straightforward blowing from featured soloists".

Track listing
All compositions by Carla Bley.
 "United States" – 15:32  
 "Strange Arrangement" – 7:46  
 "All Fall Down" – 12:46  
 "Who Will Rescue You?" – 7:12  
 "Lo Ultimo" – 9:25

Personnel
Carla Bley – piano
Lew Soloff, Guy Barker, Claude Deppa, Steven Bernstein – trumpet
Gary Valente, Richard Edwards, Fayyaz Virji – trombone
Ashley Slater – bass trombone
Roger Janotta – oboe, flute, clarinet, soprano saxophone
Wolfgang Puschnig – alto saxophone, flute
Andy Sheppard – tenor saxophone, soprano saxophone
Pete Hurt – tenor saxophone, clarinet  
Pablo Calogero – baritone saxophone
Karen Mantler – organ
Steve Swallow – bass guitar
Victor Lewis – drums
Don Alias – percussion

References

ECM Records albums
Carla Bley albums
1991 albums